In baseball, a doubles is recorded when the ball is hit so that the batter is able to advance to second base without an error by a defensive player. In Major League Baseball (MLB), the leader in each league (American League and National League) are recognized for their achievement.

The most doubles hit in one season is 67, as done by Earl Webb in 1931. Two players share the record for most times leading a league in doubles - Tris Speaker (AL) and Stan Musial (NL) each led their leagues eight times.

American League

National League

American Association

Federal League

Player's League

Union Association

National Association

Notes and references

Baseball-Reference.com

Doubles champions
Doubles